The following radio stations broadcast on AM frequency 590 kHz: 590 AM is a Regional broadcast frequency.

Argentina 
 LRA30 in Bariloche, Río Negro.
 LS4 in Buenos Aires.
 LV12 in San Miguel de Tucumán, Tucumán.

Brazil 
 ZYH-445 in Salvador
 ZYH-627 in Crateús
 ZYI213 in Vitória
 ZYI-420 in Cuiabá
 ZYI-700 in Boa Vista, Roraima
 ZYJ-234 in Curitiba
 ZYK210 in Alegrete
 ZYK-534 in Santos
 ZYK-612 in Mirandópolis
 ZYK-643 in Ribeirão Preto
 ZYL-249 in João Monlevade, Minas Gerais.

Canada

Chile 
 CA-059 in Antofagasta
 CC-059 in Concepción
 CD-059 in Punta Arenas

Colombia 
 HJCR in Medellín

Costa Rica 
 TIRN in San José

Cuba 
 CMCA in San Antonio de las Vegas
 CMMA in Guantánamo

Dominica 
 ZBC in Portsmouth

Dominican Republic 
 HIDV in La Vega

Ecuador 
 HCFA4 in Portoviejo

Guatemala 
 TGRQ in Quiche

Honduras 
 HRLP 9 in Juticalpa
 HRLP 8 in San Pedro Sula

Mexico 
 XEE-AM in Durango, Durango
 XEFD-AM in Rio Bravo, Tamaulipas
 XEGTO-AM in Guanajuato, Guanajuato
 XEPH-AM in Iztacalco, Mexico City

Nicaragua 
 YNRD in Cd. Sandino

Panama 
 HOH 3 in Chitre

Paraguay 
 ZP 32 in San Pedro de Ycuamandiyú

Peru 
 OAX4S in Lima
 OAZ8C in Pucallpa

United States

Venezuela 
 YVKL in Caracas

External links

 FCC list of radio stations on 590 kHz

References

Lists of radio stations by frequency